The 1945 All-Ireland Minor Hurling Championship was the 15th staging of the All-Ireland Minor Hurling Championship since its establishment by the Gaelic Athletic Association in 1928. As a result of the Emergency it was the first championship to be staged since 1941.

Cork entered the championship as the defending champions, however, they were beaten by Tipperary in the Munster semi-final.

On 2 September 1945 Dublin won the championship following a 3-14 to 4-6 defeat of Tipperary in the All-Ireland final. This was their first All-Ireland title.

Results

Leinster Minor Hurling Championship

First round

Semi-finals

Final

Munster Minor Hurling Championship

First round

Semi-finals

Final

Ulster Minor Hurling Championship

First round

Semi-finals

Final

All-Ireland Minor Hurling Championship

Semi-finals

Final

Championship statistics

Miscellaneous

 The All-Ireland final between Dublin and Tipperary was the first ever championship meeting between the two teams.
 Dublin became the sixth team to win the All-Ireland Championship title.

External links
 All-Ireland Minor Hurling Championship: Roll Of Honour

Minor
All-Ireland Minor Hurling Championship